Enormous may refer to:
 Enormous (band), an indie, power pop band from Derby, England.
 Enormous (song), a 2017 song by American rapper Gucci Mane.
 Enormous: The Gorge Story (2019), a movie by director Nic Davis